Digital journalism, also known as netizen journalism or online journalism, is a contemporary form of journalism where editorial content is distributed via the Internet, as opposed to publishing via print or broadcast. What constitutes digital journalism is debated by scholars; however, the primary product of journalism, which is news and features on current affairs, is presented solely or in combination as text, audio, video, or some interactive forms like storytelling stories or newsgames, and disseminated through digital media technology.

Fewer barriers to entry, lowered distribution costs, and diverse computer networking technologies have led to the widespread practice of digital journalism. It has democratized the flow of information that was previously controlled by traditional media including newspapers, magazines, radio, and television.

Some have asserted that a greater degree of creativity can be exercised with digital journalism when compared to traditional journalism and traditional media. The digital aspect may be central to the journalistic message and remains, to some extent, within the creative control of the writer, editor, and/or publisher.

It has been acknowledged that reports of its growth have tended to be exaggerated. In fact, a 2019 Pew survey showed a 16% decline in the time spent on online news sites since 2016.

Overview

Digital journalism flows as journalism flows and is difficult to pinpoint where it is and where it is going. In partnership with digital media, digital journalism uses facets of digital media to perform journalist tasks, for example, using the internet as a tool rather than a singular form of digital media. There is no absolute agreement as to what constitutes digital journalism. Mu Lin argues that, “Web and mobile platforms demand us to adopt a platform-free mindset for an all-inclusive production approach – create the [digital] contents first, then distribute via appropriate platforms." The repurposing of print content for an online audience is sufficient for some, while others require content created with the digital medium's unique features like hypertextuality. Fondevila Gascón adds multimedia and interactivity to complete the digital journalism essence. For Deuze, online journalism can be functionally differentiated from other kinds of journalism by its technological component which journalists have to consider when creating or displaying content. Digital journalistic work may range from purely editorial content like CNN (produced by professional journalists) online to public-connectivity websites like Slashdot (communication lacking formal barriers of entry). The difference of digital journalism from traditional journalism may be in its reconceptualised role of the reporter in relation to audiences and news organizations. The expectations of society for instant information was important for the evolution of digital journalism. However, it is likely that the exact nature and roles of digital journalism will not be fully known for some time.
Some researchers even argue that the free distribution of online content, online advertisement and the new way recipients use news could undermine the traditional business model of mass media distributors that is based on single-copy sales, subscriptions and the selling of advertisement space.

History
The first type of digital journalism, called teletext, was invented in the UK in 1970. Teletext is a system allowing viewers to choose which stories they wish to read and see it immediately. The information provided through teletext is brief and instant, similar to the information seen in digital journalism today.   The information was broadcast between the frames of a television signal in what was called the Vertical Blanking Interval or VBI.

American journalist, Hunter S. Thompson relied on early digital communication technology beginning by using a fax machine to report from the 1971 US presidential campaign trail as documented in his book Fear and Loathing on the Campaign Trail.

After the invention of teletext was the invention of videotex, of which Prestel was the world's first system, launching commercially in 1979 with various British newspapers such as the Financial Times lining up to deliver newspaper stories online through it. Videotex closed down in 1986 due to failing to meet end-user demand.

American newspaper companies took notice of the new technology and created their own videotex systems, the largest and most ambitious being Viewtron, a service of Knight-Ridder launched in 1981. Others were Keycom in Chicago and Gateway in Los Angeles. All of them had closed by 1986.

Next came computer Bulletin Board Systems. In the late 1980s and early 1990s, several smaller newspapers started online news services using BBS software and telephone modems. The first of these was the Albuquerque Tribune in 1989.

Computer Gaming World in September 1992 broke the news of Electronic Arts' acquisition of Origin Systems on Prodigy, before its next issue went to press. Online news websites began to proliferate in the 1990s.  An early adopter was The News & Observer in Raleigh, North Carolina which offered online news as Nando. Steve Yelvington wrote on the Poynter Institute website about Nando, owned by The N&O, by saying "Nando evolved into the first serious, professional news site on the World Wide Web". It originated in the early 1990s as "NandO Land".  It is believed that a major increase in digital online journalism occurred around this time when the first commercial web browsers, Netscape Navigator (1994), and Internet Explorer (1995). By 1996, most news outlets had an online presence. Although journalistic content was repurposed from original text/video/audio sources without change in substance, it could be consumed in different ways because of its online form through toolbars, topically grouped content, and intertextual links. A twenty-four-hour news cycle and new ways of user-journalist interaction web boards were among the features unique to the digital format. Later, portals such as AOL and Yahoo! and their news aggregators (sites that collect and categorize links from news sources) led to news agencies such as The Associated Press to supplying digitally suited content for aggregation beyond the limit of what client news providers could use in the past.

Also, Salon, was founded in 1995. In 2001 the American Journalism Review called Salon the Internet's "preeminent independent venue for journalism."

In 2008, for the first time, more Americans reported getting their national and international news from the internet, rather than newspapers. Young people aged 18 to 29 now primarily get their news via the Internet, according to a Pew Research Center report. Audiences to news sites continued to grow due to the launch of new news sites, continued investment in news online by conventional news organizations, and the continued growth in internet audiences overall. Sixty-five percent of youth now primarily access the news online.

Mainstream news sites are the most widespread form of online newsmedia production. As of 2000, the vast majority of journalists in the Western world now use the internet regularly in their daily work. In addition to mainstream news sites, digital journalism is found in index and category sites (sites without much original content but many links to existing news sites), meta- and comment sites (sites about newsmedia issues like media watchdogs), and share and discussion sites (sites that facilitate the connection of people, like Slashdot). Blogs are also another digital journalism phenomenon capable of fresh information, ranging from personal sites to those with audiences of hundreds of thousands. Digital journalism is involved in the cloud journalism phenomenon, a constant flow of contents in the Broadband Society.

Prior to 2008, the industry had hoped that publishing news online would prove lucrative enough to fund the costs of conventional newsgathering.  In 2008, however, online advertising began to slow down, and little progress was made towards development of new business models.  The Pew Project for Excellence in Journalism describes its 2008 report on the State of the News Media, its sixth, as its bleakest ever. Despite the uncertainty, online journalists report expanding newsrooms. They believe advertising is likely to be the best revenue model supporting the production of online news.

Many news organizations based in other media also distribute news online, but the amount they use of the new medium varies.  Some news organizations use the Web exclusively or as a secondary outlet for their content. The Online News Association, founded in 1999, is the largest organization representing online journalists, with more than 1,700 members whose principal livelihood involves gathering or producing news for digital presentation.

The Internet challenges traditional news organizations in several ways. Newspapers may lose classified advertising to websites, which are often targeted by interest instead of geography. These organizations are concerned about real and perceived loss of viewers and circulation to the Internet.

Hyperlocal journalism is journalism within a very small community. Hyperlocal journalism, like other types of digital journalism, is very convenient for the reader and offers more information than former types of journalism. It is free or inexpensive.

Reports of Facebook interfering in journalism

It has been acknowledged that Facebook has invested heavily in news sources and purchasing time on local news media outlets. Tech Crunch journalist Josh Constine even stated in February 2018 that the company "stole the news business" and used sponsorship to make many news publishers its "ghostwriters." In January 2019, founder Mark Zuckerberg announced that he will spend $300 million in local news buys over a three-year period.

Impact on readers
Digital journalism allows for connection and discussion at levels that print does not offer on its own.  People can comment on articles and start discussion boards to discuss articles. Before the Internet, spontaneous discussion between readers who had never met was impossible. The process of discussing a news item is a big portion of what makes for digital journalism.  People add to the story and connect with other people who want to discuss the topic.

Digital journalism creates an opportunity for niche audiences, allowing people to have more options as to what to view and read.

Digital journalism opens up new ways of storytelling; through the technical components of the new medium, digital journalists can provide a variety of media, such as audio, video, and digital photography. Regarding to how this affects the users and how it changes their usage of news, research finds that, other than a different layout and presentation in which the news are perceived, there is no drastic difference in remembering and processing the news.

Digital journalism represents a revolution of how news is consumed by society. Online sources are able to provide quick, efficient, and accurate reporting of breaking news in a matter of seconds, providing society with a synopsis of events as they occur. Throughout the development of the event, journalists are able to feed online sources the information keeping readers up-to-date in mere seconds. The speed in which a story can be posted can affect the accuracy of the reporting in a way that doesn't usually happen in print journalism. Before the emergence of digital journalism the printing process took much more time, allowing for the discovery and correction of errors.

News consumers must become Web literate and use critical thinking to evaluate the credibility of sources.  Because it is possible for anyone to write articles and post them on the Internet, the definition of journalism is changing. Because it is becoming increasingly simple for the average person to have an impact in the news world through tools like blogs and even comments on news stories on reputable news websites, it becomes increasingly difficult to sift through the massive amount of information coming in from the digital area of journalism.

There are great advantages with digital journalism and the new blogging evolution that people are becoming accustomed to, but there are disadvantages. For instance, people are used to what they already know and can't always catch up quickly with the new technologies in the 21st century. The goals of print and digital journalism are the same, although different tools are needed to function.

The interaction between the writer and consumer is new, and this can be credited to digital journalism. There are many ways to get personal thoughts on the Web. There are some disadvantages to this, however, the main one being factual information. There is a pressing need for accuracy in digital journalism, and until they find a way to press accuracy, they will still face some criticism.

One major dispute regards the credibility of these online news websites. A digital journalism credibility study performed by the Online News Association compares the online public credibility ratings to actual media respondent credibility ratings. Looking at a variety of online media sources, the study found that overall the public saw online media as more credible than it actually is.

The effects of digital journalism are evident worldwide. This form of journalism has pushed journalists to reform and evolve. Older journalists who are not tech savvy have felt the blunt force of this. In recent months, a number of older journalists have been pushed out and younger journalists brought in because of their lower cost and ability to work in advanced technology settings.

Impact on publishers
Many newspapers, such as The New York Times, have created online sites to remain competitive and have taken advantage of audio, video, and text linking to remain at the top of news consumers' lists as most of the news enthusiasm now reach their base through hand held devices such as smartphones, tablets etc. Hence audio or video backing is a definite advantage.

Newspapers rarely break news stories any more, with most websites reporting on breaking news before the cable news channels. Digital journalism allows for reports to start out vague and generalized, and progress to a better story. Newspapers and TV cable are at a disadvantage because they generally can only put together stories when an ample amount of detail and information are available.  Often, newspapers have to wait for the next day, or even two days later if it is a late-breaking story, before being able to publish it. Newspapers lose a lot of ground to their online counterparts, with advertising revenue shifting to the Internet, and subscription to the printed paper decreasing. People are now able to find the news they want, when they want, without having to leave their homes or pay to receive the news , even though there are still people who are willing to pay for online journalistic content.

Because of this, many people have viewed digital journalism as the death of journalism. According to communication scholar Nicole Cohen, "four practices stand out as putting pressure on traditional journalism production: outsourcing, unpaid labour, metrics and measurement, and automation". Free advertising on websites such as Craigslist has transformed how people publicize; the Internet has created a faster, cheaper way for people to get news out, thus creating the shift in ad sales from standard newspapers to the Internet. There has been a substantial effect of digital journalism and media on the newspaper industry, with the creation of new business models. It is now possible to contemplate a time in the near future when major towns will no longer have a newspaper and when magazines and network news operations will employ no more than a handful of reporters. Many newspapers and individual print journalists have been forced out of business because of the popularity of digital journalism. The newspapers that have not been willing to be forced out of business have attempted to survive by saving money, laying off staff, shrinking the size of the publications, eliminating editions, as well as partnering with other businesses to share coverage and content. In 2009, one study concluded that most journalists are ready to compete in a digital world and that these journalists believe the transition from print to digital journalism in their newsroom is moving too slowly. Some highly specialized positions in the publishing industry have become obsolete. The growth in digital journalism and the near collapse of the economy has also led to downsizing for those in the industry.

Students wishing to become journalists now need to be familiar with digital journalism in order to be able to contribute and develop journalism skills. Not only must a journalist analyze their audience and focus on effective communication with them, they have to be quick; news websites are able to update their stories within minutes of the news event. Other skills may include creating a website and uploading information using basic programming skills.

Critics believe digital journalism has made it easier for individuals who are not qualified journalists to misinform the general public. Many believe that this form of journalism has created a number of sites that do not have credible information. Sites such as PerezHilton.com have been criticized for blurring the lines between journalism and opinionated writing.

Some critics believe that newspapers should not switch to a solely Internet-based format, but instead keep a component of print as well as digital.

Digital journalism allows citizens and readers the opportunity to join in on threaded discussions relating to a news article that has been read by the public. This offers an excellent source for writers and reporters to decide what is important and what should be omitted in the future. These threads can provide useful information to writers of digital journalism so that future articles can be pruned and improved to possibly create a better article the next time around.

Implications on traditional journalism 
Digitization is currently causing many changes to traditional journalistic practices. The labor of journalists, in general, is becoming increasingly dependent on digital journalism. Scholars outline that this is a change to the execution of journalism and not the conception part of the labor process. They also contend that this is simply the de-skilling of some skills and the up-skilling of others. This theory is in contention to the notion that technological determinism is negatively effecting journalism, as it should be understood that it is just changing the traditional skill set. Communication scholar Nicole Cohen believes there are several trends putting pressure on this traditional skill set. Some of which being outsourcing, algorithms, and automation. Although Cohen believes that technology could be used to improve journalism, she feels the current trends in digital journalism are so far affecting the practice in a negative way.

There is also the impact that digital journalism is influencing the uprising of citizen journalism. Because digital journalism takes place online and is contributed mostly by citizens on user-generated content sites, there is competition growing between the two. Citizen journalism allows anyone to post anything, and because of that, journalists are being forced by their employers to publish more news content than before, which often means rushing news stories and failing to verify the source of information.

Work outside traditional press

The Internet has also given rise to more participation by people who are not normally journalists, such as with Indy Media (Max Perez).

Bloggers write on web logs or blogs. Traditional journalists often do not consider bloggers to automatically be journalists. This has more to do with standards and professional practices than the medium. For instance, crowdsourcing and crowdfunding journalism attracts amateur journalists, as well as ambitious professionals that are restrained by the boundaries set by traditional press. However, the implication of these types of journalism is that it disregards the professional norms of journalistic practices that ensures accuracy and impartiality of the content.  But, blogging has generally gained at least more attention and has led to some effects on mainstream journalism, such as exposing problems related to a television piece about President George W. Bush's National Guard Service.

Recent legal judgements have determined that bloggers are entitled to the same protections as other journalists subject to the same responsibilities. In the United States, the Electronic Frontier Foundation has been instrumental in advocating for the rights of journalist bloggers.

The Supreme Court of Canada ruled that: "[96] A second preliminary question is what the new defence should be called. In arguments before us, the defence was referred to as the responsible journalism test. This has the value of capturing the essence of the defence in succinct style. However, the traditional media are rapidly being complemented by new ways of communicating on matters of public interest, many of them online, which do not involve journalists. These new disseminators of news and information should, absent good reasons for exclusion, be subject to the same laws as established media outlets. I agree with Lord Hoffmann that the new defence is "available to anyone who publishes material of public interest in any medium": Jameel, at para. 54."

Other significant tools of on-line journalism are Internet forums, discussion boards and chats, especially those representing the Internet version of official media. The widespread use of the Internet all over the world created a unique opportunity to create a meeting place for both sides in many conflicts, such as the Israeli–Palestinian conflict and the First and Second Chechen Wars. Often this gives a unique chance to find new, alternative solutions to the conflict, but often the Internet is turned into the battlefield by contradicting parties creating endless "online battles."

Internet radio and podcasts are other growing independent media based on the Internet.

Blogs
With the rise of digital media, there is a move from the traditional journalist to the blogger or amateur journalist. Blogs can be seen as a new genre of journalism because of their "narrative style of news characterized by personalization" that moves away from traditional journalism's approach, changing journalism into a more conversational and decentralized type of news. Blogging has become a large part of the transmitting of news and ideas across cites, states, and countries, and bloggers argue that blogs themselves are now breaking stories. Even online news publications have blogs that are written by their affiliated journalists or other respected writers.  Blogging allows readers and journalists to be opinionated about the news and talk about it in an open environment.  Blogs allow comments where some news outlets do not, due to the need to constantly monitor what is posted.  By allowing comments, the reader can interact with a story instead of just absorbing the words on the screen. According to one 2007 study, 15% of those who read blogs read them for news.

However, many blogs are highly opinionated and have a bias. Some are not verified to be true. The Federal Trade Commission (FTC) established guidelines mandating that bloggers disclose any free goods or services they receive from third parties in 2009 in response to a question of the integrity of product and service reviews in the online community.

The development of blogging communities has partly resulted because of the lack of local news coverage, the spread of misinformation, and the manipulation of news. Blogging platforms are often used as mediums to spread ideas and connect to others with similar mentalities. Anonymity lives within these platforms that circulates different perspectives. Some have postulated that blogs' usage of public opinions as facts has gained them status and creditability. Memes are often shared on these blogs due to its social phenomenon and its relation to existing subcultures which often attain high engagement. Traditional journalism has helped set the foundation for blogs, which are frequently used to question mainstream media reported by journalist.

Citizen journalism
Digital journalism's lack of a traditional "editor" has given rise to citizen journalism. The early advances that the digital age offered journalism were faster research, easier editing, conveniences, and a faster delivery time for articles. The Internet has broadened the effect that the digital age has on journalism. Because of the popularity of the Internet, most people have access and can add their forms of journalism to the information network. This allows anyone who wants to share something they deem important that has happened in their community. Individuals who are not professional journalists who present news through their blogs or websites are often referred to as citizen journalists. One does not need a degree to be a citizen journalist. Citizen journalists are able to publish information that may not be reported otherwise, and the public has a greater opportunity to be informed. Some companies use the information that a citizen journalist relays when they themselves can not access certain situations, for example, in countries where freedom of the press is limited. Anyone can record events happening and send it anywhere they wish, or put it on their website. Non-profit and grassroots digital journalism sites may have far fewer resources than their corporate counterparts, yet due to digital media are able to have websites that are technically comparable. Other media outlets can then pick up their story and run with it as they please, thus allowing information to reach wider audiences.

For citizen journalism to be effective and successful, there needs to be citizen editors. Their role being to solicit other people to provide accurate information and to mediate interactivity among users. An example can be found in the start-up of the South Korean online daily newspaper, OhMyNews, where the founder recruited several hundred volunteer "citizen reporters" to write news articles that were edited and processed by four professional journalists.

News collections

The Internet also offers options such as personalized news feeds and aggregators, which compile news from different websites into one site. One of the most popular news aggregators is Google News. Others include  Topix.net, and TheFreeLibrary.com.

But, some people see too much personalization as detrimental. For example, some fear that people will have narrower exposure to news, seeking out only those commentators who already agree with them.

As of March 2005, Wikinews rewrites articles from other news organizations. Original reporting remains a challenge on the Internet as the burdens of verification and legal risks (especially from plaintiff-friendly jurisdictions like BC) remain high in the absence of any net-wide approach to defamation.

See also
Online newspaper
Open source journalism
Wikinews
Toons Mag
User-generated content

References

Sources
 Bentley, Clyde H. 2011. Citizen journalism: Back to the future? Geopolitics, History, and International Relations 3 (1): p. 103ff.
 Deuze, Mark. 2003. The web and its journalisms: Considering the consequences of different types of newsmedia online. New Media & Society 5 (2): 203-230.
 Fondevila Gascón, Joan Francesc (2009). El papel decisivo de la banda ancha en el Espacio Iberoamericano del Conocimiento. Revista Iberoamericana de Ciencia, Tecnología y Sociedad–CTS, n. 2, pp. 1–15.  
 Fondevila Gascón, Joan Francesc (2010). El cloud journalism: un nuevo concepto de producción para el periodismo del siglo XXI. Observatorio (OBS*) Journal, v. 4, n. 1 (2010), pp. 19–35. 
 Fondevila Gascón, Joan Francesc; Del Olmo Arriaga, Josep Lluís and Sierra Sánchez, Javier (2011). New communicative markets, new business models in the digital press. Trípodos (Extra 2011-VI International Conference on Communication and Reality-Life without Media, Universitat Ramon Llull), pp. 301–310. 
 Kawamoto, Kevin. 2003. Digital Journalism: Emerging Media and the Changing Horizons of Journalism. Lanham, Md.: Rowman & Littlefield
 Online Journalism Review. 2002. The third wave of online journalism. Online Journalism Review
 Rogers, Tony. What is hyperlocal journalism? Sites that focus on areas often ignored by larger news outlets" about.com, accessdate= September 12, 2011
 Scott, Ben. 2005. A contemporary history of digital journalism. Television & New Media 6 (1): 89-126
 Wall, Melissa. 2005. "Blogs of war: Weblogs as news." Journalism 6 (2): 153-172

Digital media
 
Types of journalism
Citizen journalism
Technology in society
Citizen media
New media